Archana Puran Singh (born 26 September 1962) is an Indian actress and television personality. She is known for her comedy roles in several Bollywood movies and as a judge in the comedy shows The Kapil Sharma Show and Comedy Circus. She is mostly regarded for her role of Miss Braganza in the film Kuch Kuch Hota Hai. Archana Puran Singh has been featured in more than 100  films and television series.

Personal life
Archana's first marriage did not work and ended in a divorce. Thereafter, she was involved with Bollywood director, Pankaj Parashar, who directed her in Jalwa. She later married actor Parmeet Sethi on 30 June 1992. They have two sons, Aryamann and Ayushmaan.

Career

In films
She made her film debut with Nari Hira's TV movie Abhishek opposite Aditya Pancholi in 1987. Later that year, she starred in Jalwa opposite Naseeruddin Shah. Later, she did small roles in big banner films like Agneepath (1990), Saudagar (1991), Shola aur Shabnam (1992), Aashiq Awara (1993), and Raja Hindustani (1996); she did item songs in films like the Govinda-starrer thriller Baaz and the Suniel Shetty starrer Judge Mujrim.

Thereafter, she has largely restricted herself to supporting roles in Hindi films, often in comedies. Some of her  films are Love Story 2050, Mohabbatein, Krrish, Kuch Kuch Hota Hai, Masti, De Dana Dan and Bol Bachchan.

In television
She became a television anchor, with Wah, Kya Scene Hai on Zee TV in 1993 which was followed by Uncensored. She later acted in Shrimaan Shrimati, Junoon  and hosted Archana Talkies on Sony Entertainment Television. She also acted in the TV show Zee Horror Show.

She also directed sitcoms like Jaane Bhi Do Paaro and Nehle Pe Dehla and produced Samne Wali Khidki.

In 2005, she was a contestant in the dance reality show Nach Baliye 1, in which she participated with her husband, Parmeet Sethi; they were eliminated in the sixth episode. In 2006, she and her husband hosted another dance reality show Jhalak Dikhhla Jaa (season 1).

Thereafter, she appeared as a judge on comedy shows, including Sony TV India's Comedy Circus. She appeared as a judge in Comedy Circus (season 1) (2006) and Comedy Circus (season 2) (2008). In January 2008, she hosted Kaho Na Yaar Hai on Star Plus, along with her husband, Parmeet Sethi. With the end of Comedy Circus (season 2) in September 2008, it was followed by another show, Comedy Circus – Kaante Ki Takkar. After Comedy Circus – Kaante Ki Takkar, she was the judge of Comedy Circus – Teen Ka Tadka, Comedy Circus Ke Superstar, Comedy Circus Ka Jadoo, Jubilee Comedy Circus, Comedy Circus Ke Taansen, Comedy Ka Naya Daur, Kahaani Comedy Circus Ki, Comedy Circus Ke Ajoobe, and Comedy Circus Ke Mahabali. She appeared in SAB TV's The Great Indian Family Drama as Begum Paro.

In 2019, she entered as the judge in The Kapil Sharma Show. In 2019, she acted as Lakhan's mother, Paramjeet, in SAB TV serial, My Name Ijj Lakhan opposite her real life husband, Parmeet Sethi.

Filmography

Films

 Nikaah (1982)
 Jalwa (1987)
 Woh Phir Aayegi (1988)
 Aaj Ke Angaarey (1988)
 The Perfect Murder (1988)
 Ladaai (1989)
 Aag Ka Gola (1990)
 Agneepath (1990)
 Jeena Teri Gali Mein (1991)
 Hag Toofan (1991)
 Jaan Ki Kasam (1991)
 Saudagar (1991)
 Zulm Ki Hukumat (1992)
 Shola Aur Shabnam (1992)
 Naalaya Seidhi (1992) (Tamil)
 Pandiyan (1992) (Tamil)
 Bandhu (1992)
 Baaz (1992)
 Kondapalli Raja (1993) (Telugu)
 Mahakaal (1993) Anita / Mohini Parent boyfriend
 Aashiq Awara (1993)
 Yuhi Kabhi (1994)
 Pyaar Ka Rog (1994)
 Takkar (1995)
 Aisi Bhi Kya Jaldi Hai (1996)
 Raja Hindustani (1996)
 Share Bazaar (1997)
 Judge Mujrim (1997)
 Kuch Kuch Hota Hai (1998) – Miss Breganza
 Bade Dilwala (1999)
 Saamne Wali Khidki (2000)
 Mela (2000)
 Mohabbatein (2000)
 Censor (2001)
 Moksha: Salvation (2001)
 Maine Dil Tujhko Diya (2002)
 Jhankaar Beats (2003)
 Khanjar (2003)
 Janasheen (2003)
 Enakku 20 Unakku 18 / Nee Manasu Naaku Telusu (2003) (Tamil / Telugu)
 Aabra Ka Daabra (2004)
 Masti (2004)
 Rok Sako To Rok Lo (2004)
 Insan (2005)
 The Gold Bracelet (2006) – Baljit Singh
 Krrish (2006)
 Mera Dil Leke Dekho (2006)
 Mere Baap Pehle Aap (2008) – Inspector Bhawani
 Love Story 2050 (2008)
 Money Hai Toh Honey Hai (2008) – Dolly
 Oye Lucky! Lucky Oye! (2008)
 Good Luck! (2008)
 Kal Kisne Dekha (2009)
 Tera Mera Ki Rishta (Punjabi) (2009)
 De Dana Dan (2009) – Kuljeet Kaur
 Luv Ka The End (2011)
 Haat-The Weekly Bazaar (2011)
 Bol Bachchan (2012)
 Kick (2014)
 Dolly Ki Doli (2015) as Manjot's mother
 Uvaa (2015)
Housefull 4 (2019) (photo only)
 Virgin Bhanupriya (2020)

Television

Awards and nominations

References

External links
 

1962 births
Living people
Indian film actresses
Actresses in Hindi cinema
Indian women television presenters
Indian television presenters
Actresses from Dehradun
Screen Awards winners
20th-century Indian actresses
21st-century Indian actresses